George Green (2 May 1901 – 1980) was an English footballer who played as a wing half in the Football League with Sheffield United in the 1920s and 1930s.

He was born in Leamington Spa and played for a number of local teams before signing for First Division side Sheffield United in 1923. He went on to make 422 senior appearances for the Yorkshire club, scoring 11 times. He was a member of the successful United side that won the FA Cup in 1925.

Four weeks after winning the FA Cup, Green was awarded his first England cap against France. He went on to appear eight times for his country, winning his last cap against Belgium on 19 May 1928.

He finished his career at Leamington Town.

References 

1901 births
1980 deaths
Sportspeople from Leamington Spa
Association football wing halves
England international footballers
English Football League players
Leamington F.C. players
Sheffield United F.C. players
English Football League representative players
English footballers
Nuneaton Borough F.C. players
FA Cup Final players